The South Western Times is a weekly English language newspaper published for Bunbury and the South West region in Western Australia.

The newspaper was first published in 1888 and was originally titled the Southern Advertiser. The name was changed later the same year to the Southern Times and in 1917 it became the South Western Times.

The distribution area includes many towns in the South West, including Bunbury, Boyanup, Capel, Donnybrook, Collie, Harvey, Balingup and Darkan. The paper is published every Thursday and in 2019 has a circulation of 6,300 and a readership of 19,000.

See also 
 List of newspapers in Australia
 List of newspapers in Western Australia

References

External links 
 

South West Newspapers
Publications established in 1888
1888 establishments in Australia